Julius Beck is a former association football player who represented New Zealand at international level.

Beck made a solitary official international appearance for New Zealand in a 4–0 loss to New Caledonia on 8 November 1967.

References 

Year of birth missing (living people)
Living people
New Zealand association footballers
New Zealand international footballers
New Zealand people of Hungarian descent
Wellington United players
Association footballers not categorized by position